At least two ships of the French Navy have been named Colmar:

 , formerly the  SMS Kolberg acquired in 1920 and scrapped in 1929
 , an  acquired in 1956 and scrapped in 1985

French Navy ship names